A quintuplet is a set of five similar items. It may refer to:

 Each of the children born in a rare five-child multiple birth
 In music, a tuplet of five successive notes of equal duration
 The Quintuplet cluster, a star cluster near the Galactic Center
 Quintuplets, an American sitcom
 Quintuplets 2000, an episode of the American television series South Park